Patrik Kemláge (born 24 May 1993) is a Slovak football midfielder who currently plays for MFK Alekšince.

Career
Kemláge made his first Corgoň Liga appearance against FK Senica.

External links
FC Nitra profile

Eurofotbal.cz profile

References

1993 births
Living people
Slovak footballers
Association football midfielders
FC Nitra players
ŠK Svätý Jur players
Slovak Super Liga players
Place of birth missing (living people)